Advanced Dungeons & Dragons Adventure Gamebook is a series of 18 gamebooks published from 1985 to 1988. The series was initially titled Super Endless Quest Adventure Gamebook as the books added a more complex game system to stories which otherwise share the same style with the Endless Quest books. On the third book the series' title changed to Advanced Dungeons & Dragons Super Endless Quest Adventure Gamebook and it finally became Advanced Dungeons & Dragons Adventure Gamebook from the fourth book onwards.

Books in the series

References

External links 
 Demian's Advanced Dungeons & Dragons Adventure Gamebooks page
 Dungeons & Dragons Wiki: Advanced Dungeons & Dragons Adventure Gamebooks

Dungeons & Dragons books
Fantasy books by series
Gamebooks